Bally Ache (February 3, 1957 – October 28, 1960) was an American Thoroughbred racehorse who won the Preakness Stakes in 1960 but died later that year. In her book American Classic Pedigrees (1914–2002), author Avalyn Hunter wrote that Bally Ache was "a crowd favorite" who "won hearts by his sheer determination."

Background
Bally Ache was a bay horse bred by brothers Alan and Marvin Gaines at their Twin Oak Farm in Walton, Kentucky. He was sired the Irish import Ballydam out of Celestial Blue. The colt was sold as a yearling as part of a $5,000 two-horse deal. His purchasers were Leonard D. Fruchtman and Morris Fruchtman, steel company executives from Toledo, Ohio, who raced a small string of horses racing under the nom de course Edgehill Farm. The colt was trained by Homer James "Jimmy" Pitt.

Racing career
As a two-year-old, Bally Ache made  sixteen starts. He won five stakes races, set a new track record at Jamaica Race Course for five furlongs, and finished out of the money just once. He ended the year ranked second in earnings to Bellehurst Stable's 1959 Champion Two-Year-Old, Warfare.

At age three, Bally Ache won the Flamingo Stakes and Florida Derby on the way to the Triple Crown. In the Kentucky Derby, C. V. Whitney's colt Tompion, ridden by Bill Shoemaker, was coming off wins in the Santa Anita Derby and the Blue Grass Stakes and was sent off as the betting favorite. Bally Ache, under jockey Bobby Ussery, was the second choice. However, jockey Bill Hartack aboard 6:1 outsider Venetian Way, whom Bally Ache had already beaten four times, won. Despite Bally Ache's second-place finish, it did not deter the Turfland racing syndicate led by Joseph L. Arnold, who bought the colt for what Sports Illustrated magazine described as the "staggering price of $1,250,000". Bally Ache then won by four lengths in the 84th running of the Preakness Stakes.

Entered in the Belmont Stakes, the third leg of the Triple Crown, Bally Ache came up lame the day before the race and was withdrawn. After returning to racing, in his fourth outing he suffered a career-ending ankle injury. He was scheduled to stand at stud for his owners but developed an intestinal ailment that led to his death on October 28, 1960. He was buried at Bosque Bonita Farm in Versailles, Kentucky.

Breeding

References

1957 racehorse births
1960 racehorse deaths
Racehorses bred in Kentucky
Racehorses trained in the United States
Horse racing track record setters
Preakness Stakes winners
Thoroughbred family 12-b